All the Beauty and the Bloodshed is a 2022 American documentary film which explores the career of Nan Goldin and the fall of the Sackler family. The film is produced, co-edited and directed by Laura Poitras. Poitras said, "Nan's art and vision has inspired my work for years, and has influenced generations of filmmakers."

The film premiered on September 3, 2022, at the 79th Venice International Film Festival, where it was awarded the Golden Lion, making it the second documentary (following Sacro GRA in 2013) to win the top prize at Venice. It also screened at the 2022 New York Film Festival, where it was the festival's centerpiece film and for which Goldin designed two official posters. The film was released in cinemas by Neon on November 23, 2022. It received acclaim from critics and was nominated for Best Documentary Feature at the 95th Academy Awards.

Synopsis
The film examines the life and career of photographer and activist Nan Goldin and her efforts to hold Purdue Pharma, owned by the Sackler family, accountable for the opioid epidemic. Goldin, a well known photographer whose work often documented the LGBT subcultures and the HIV/AIDS crisis, founded the advocacy group P.A.I.N. (Prescription Addiction Intervention Now) in 2017 after her addiction to Oxycontin, and had a near fatal overdose of fentanyl. P.A.I.N. specifically targets museums and other arts institutions to hold the art community accountable for its collaboration with the Sackler family and its well publicized financial support of the arts. Since P.A.I.N.'s activities most of the targeted museums have severed all ties with the Sackler family and in 2021 Purdue Pharma filed for bankruptcy.

The film is structured in seven chapters, each of which begins with a photographic sequence or archival footage of a period of Goldin's life and then transitions to footage of her recent protests with P.A.I.N. The slideshow of archival photographs is reminiscent of Goldin's work creating slideshows or series of photographs, such as The Ballad of Sexual Dependency. Footage of P.A.I.N. demonstrations include its first 2018 protest at the Metropolitan Museum of Art's Temple of Dendur as well as similar demonstrations at the Louvre and the Guggenheim Museum. Goldin is the primary narrator of the film, with additional interviews from associates such as journalist Patrick Radden Keefe and P.A.I.N. member Megan Kapler.

Cast
 Nan Goldin
 Patrick Radden Keefe
 Megan Kapler

Production
Goldin and two other activists had been filming their activities with P.A.I.N. for two years, intending to make a documentary about the activist group. Goldin then approached the film's production company about turning the footage into a film, and Laura Poitras was suggested to Goldin to direct the film, based on Poitras's work on Astro Noise for the Whitney Museum. Goldin was initially skeptical because of Poitras' previous political films, saying "I thought I was not going to be interesting to her because I don't have any state secrets."

Goldin has stated that most of the film's footage and photographs come directly from her. Poitras expanded on Goldin's vision for the project, and chose to make a more well-rounded film about Goldin's life and career. These biographical elements include the suicide of Goldin's sister, Goldin's drug use and her sex work activities, which she had never previously publicized, as well as her art career and achievements. Goldin initially felt uncomfortable with allowing Poitras to control the film and the depiction of her life, but was happy with the finished film. Goldin said that Poitras was "telling my story in my voice, but it's not exactly my version as I would tell it. But she's been amazing into letting me have a lot of input into what's used and not used."

Release
The film premiered on September 3, 2022, at the 79th Venice International Film Festival, where it was awarded the Golden Lion. It screened at the 2022 Toronto International Film Festival on September 9. Shortly afterwards Poitras criticized both the Venice and Toronto festivals for screening a film produced by Hillary Clinton, In Her Hands. Poitras stated that she was "alarmed" by Clinton's presence at the festivals, adding "Hillary Clinton was actively involved in the wars and occupations in Iraq and Afghanistan. She supported the escalation of troops." It also screened at the 2022 New York Film Festival, where it was the festival's centerpiece film.

In August 2022, before its Venice premiere, Neon acquired the US distribution rights for the movie while the UK and Ireland rights were taken by Altitude Film Distribution. In September 2022, HBO Documentary Films acquired television and streaming rights to the film. The film was released in theaters by Neon on November 23, 2022. The film coincides with This Will Not End Well, a retrospective of Goldin's work at Stockholm's Moderna Museet which opened October 29, 2022.

Reception

Critical response
On Rotten Tomatoes, the film holds an approval rating of 95% based on 118 reviews, with an average rating of 8.7/10. The website's consensus reads, "All the Beauty and the Bloodshed is a bone-deep look at a photographer's fight against addiction and the institution responsible for her pain through her gritty lens." According to Metacritic, which assigned a weighted average score of 90 out of 100 based on 34 critics, the film received "universal acclaim".

Godfrey Cheshire praised the film for being equally Poitras' and Goldin's work, stating that "there's effectively no conceptual distance between the auteur documentarian and her artist subject...the result of their sympathetic engagement is a collaboration of rare beauty and power."

On Dec 21, 2022, the film was shortlisted by the Academy of Motion Picture Arts and Sciences for Best Documentary Feature Film at the 95th Academy Awards. It was ultimately nominated in the category.

Accolades

References

External links
 All the Beauty and the Bloodshed at Praxis Films
 
 
 

2020s American films
2020s English-language films
2022 LGBT-related films
2022 documentary films
2022 films
American documentary films
Documentary films about lesbians
Documentary films about gay men
Documentary films about LGBT culture
Documentary films about LGBT topics
Documentary films about American politics
Films directed by Laura Poitras
Golden Lion winners
Participant (company) films
American LGBT-related films
Sackler family
Documentary films about drug addiction
Opioid epidemic
Documentary films about activists